Lloyd Ultan (born 1938) is a historian and author. A native of The Bronx in New York City, he has been the borough's historian since 1996. He is a professor of history at Fairleigh Dickinson University's and a member of the adjunct faculty at Lehman College. Ultan received a B.A. in history from Hunter College in 1959 and an M.A. in history from Columbia University in 1960.

He has written several books, including The Beautiful Bronx (1920-1950),  The Bronx in the Innocent Years: 1890-1925, and Bronx Accent. Ultan is renowned for his walking tours. His predecessor as the official Bronx Borough Historian was Dr. William A. Tieck, who served from 1980 to 1996.

Selected works

 Legacy of the Revolution: The Valentine-Varian House (1983), popular general history
 Bronx Accent: A Literary and Pictorial History of the Borough (2006), popular general history
 Blacks in the Colonial Bronx Era: A Documentary History (2010), popular general history
 The Bronx: The Ultimate Guide to New York City's Beautiful Borough (2015), popular general history
 The Northern Borough: A History Of The Bronx (2009), popular general history
 The Bronx in the frontier era: from the beginning to 1696 (1994)
 The Beautiful Bronx (1920–1950) (1979), heavily illustrated
 The Birth of the Bronx, 1609–1900 (2000), popular
 The Bronx in the innocent years, 1890–1925 (1985), popular
 The Bronx: It Was Only Yesterday, 1935–1965 (1992), heavily illustrated popular history
 "History of the Bronx River," Paper presented to the Bronx River Alliance, November 5, 2002 (notes taken by Maarten de Kadt, November 16, 2002), retrieved on August 29, 2008. This 2½ hour talk covers much of the early history of the Bronx as a whole, in addition to the Bronx River.

See also
 History of the Bronx
 Gary Hermalyn - Centennial Historian of New York City.
 The Bronx County Historical Society

References

External links 

Podcast Professor Lloyd Ultan Bronx Borough Historian Bronx Bohemian

Fairleigh Dickinson University faculty
Living people
American male journalists
Writers from the Bronx
1938 births
Journalists from New York City
History of the Bronx
Lehman College faculty
Historians of New York City
21st-century American historians
21st-century American male writers
20th-century American historians
American male non-fiction writers
Historians from New York (state)
20th-century American male writers